Padmapriya (born Padmalochani; died 16 November 1997) was an Indian actress who worked in Kannada, Tamil,  Malayalam and Telugu films. Her first movie was in Telugu, Adapillala Tandri (1974). In Kannada, she debuted with Bangarada Gudi (1976) and was a popular actress during the late 1970s. She has the distinction of having acted opposite the legendary Dr. Rajkumar in three successive hit movies in a single year (1978) - Operation Diamond Racket, Thayige Thakka Maga and Shankar Guru. She starred opposite Anant Nag in the comedy Narada Vijaya and the novel-based Baadada Hoo and both were highly successful. She acted in four to five movies with Dr. Vishnuvardhan, and played glamorous roles. Srinath, Ashok and Lokesh were her other costars in Kannada movies.

She had a successful career in Tamil films as a lead heroine between 1974 and 1981  movies Vazhthungal,  Vaira Nenjam, Mohana Punnagai, Vaazhnthu Kaattugiren, Kuppathu Raja, Aayiram Jenmangal, and Madhuraiyai Meetta Sundharapandiyan are some of her notable Tamil films. She acted opposite Sivaji Ganesan in Vaira Nenjam and Mohana Punnagai. She was paired with M. G. Ramachandran in Madhuraiyai Meetta Sundharapandiyan portraying the role of a princess. She acted in nearly 80 movies, mainly in South Indian languages.

Personal life
Padmapriya was regarded as the Hema Malini of the South. Padmapriya was born in Karnataka. In 1983, she married Srinivasan and the couple has a daughter named Vasumathi. Just a year after marriage, the couple filed for divorce, which dragged on for a long time. After filing for divorce, Padmapriya stayed with her parents for 13 years at T. Nagar.

Death 
Padmapriya died on 16 November 1997 from heart disease as well as kidney failure. After her death, Vasumathi tried to enter the film industry but failed and is now settled in the United Kingdom.

Partial filmography
Padmapriya was fluent in all four South Indian languages and dubbed in her own voice. Her last movie in Tamil was Thotta Chinungi, where she played a mother's role. Table is in order of languages in which she acted, from the most to the fewest  films after her marriage.

Tamil

Kannada

Malayalam

Telugu

References

Indian film actresses
1997 deaths
Year of birth missing
Actresses from Karnataka
Actresses in Kannada cinema
Actresses in Telugu cinema
Actresses in Malayalam cinema
Actresses in Tamil cinema